This is a list of significant public domain resources that are behind a paywall, in other words information which it is legal under copyright law for anyone to copy and distribute, but which are currently charged for on the Internet. Notable categories are some government publications, including legal documents, works on which copyright has expired, including paintings and other artworks, books and journals. In the case of printed works there is often some availability from libraries. Some works may be mirrored by activists on-line, such action may be legal from a copyright point of view, but contrary to the terms and conditions of the site hosting the paywalled information.

United States
In the United States, all work of the federal government (with a few exceptions) and all items published prior to January 1, 1925 are in the public domain, as are any items published without a complete copyright notice before 1988 or any items published from December 31, 1963 or earlier that did not have their copyrights renewed. (see: public domain in the United States)

 United States federal court documents stored on the PACER system.
 Los Angeles Times archive
 The Washington Post archive from 1877
 The Atlanta Journal-Constitution archive from 1868
 The Christian Science Monitor archive from 1908
 The Boston Globe archive from 1872
 Hartford Courant from 1764
 Chicago Tribune from 1852
 The New York Times archive from 1851
 National Centers for Environmental Information records
 The Miami Herald

United Kingdom
 The National Archives archive

References

Online archives
Public domain